The Angara Range is a mountain range in Krasnoyarsk Krai and Irkutsk Oblast, Russia, part of the Central Siberian Plateau.

There are large iron ore deposits in the area of the Angara Range.

Geography
The Angara Range is made up of hills of moderate height roughly aligned from southwest to northeast in the southeastern part of the Central Siberian Plateau. To the east and southeast the range smoothly merges with the higher Lena-Angara Plateau.

The ridges of the range are roughly parallel, They have gently sloping interfluves, composed of Lower Paleozoic carbonate rocks, terrigenous sediments and stratigraphic traps.

Hydrography
The southern and central areas of the range are drained by a few left and right tributaries of the Angara which form small waterfalls and rapids when crossing the trap zones. The Lower Tunguska and Stony Tunguska rivers, right tributaries of the Yenisei, originate in the northern slopes.

Flora
The hills of the range are mainly covered with larch taiga in the northeastern part of the range, with pine, fir and Siberian Pine in the southwestern section.

See also
List of mountains and hills of Russia

References

Central Siberian Plateau
Mountains of Krasnoyarsk Krai
Mountains of Irkutsk Oblast

ru:Ангарский кряж